Dream Street is a British children's television series that ran from 6 May 1999 to 2002 on CITV, and from 7 October 2002 to 28 February 2003 on Nick Jr UK. The show is narrated by British comedian Russ Abbot, and was aimed at children aged from 2 to 7. The show features talking toy vehicles, which were radio controlled in real time.

The show was set in a story book resting on the bedside table, and in later series with a child holding it, of a playroom during the night, whilst the child was asleep. The room also includes an element of Dream Street within it - the teddy bear clock. In later series, the title sequence revealed more of the things within the room, such as model Saturn bedposts.

For Series 1 & 2 1999, the original theme tune as part of the road safety campaign, which was repeated at the end of the show accompanying a short promo.

CITV, the original broadcaster, repeated the series in 2008–09, but it ended shortly after.

There have been VHS and DVD releases of the series by Carlton Video.

In 2017, the series came back once again, this time with enhanced effects and modifications, such as Jack Hammer being in CGI.

Characters
 Buddy – a young pickup truck with various removable accessories, and the main character of the show as well as Daisy's best friend. He loves to help out his friends with magic. He has a yellow livery with the red B on both doors and he has a red circle with a red B for his nose. His catchphrase is, "It's Magic Time!". He is voiced by Charlotte Bellamy.
 Daisy Do-right – a small 'panda car' police car who is Buddy's best friend. She works with the police and hates it when her Sleeping Policemen fall asleep on patrol (they have narcolepsy). She is responsible for giving do-right duties to characters who do silly things. She also loves to visit the field full of daisies. She has a white livery with pink and orange checkers on the sides and she has a daisy for her nose. Just like Buddy, she is voiced by Charlotte Bellamy.
 Half-Pint – a small, young, and shy milk float. He now likes sleeping in the dark and can be afraid of other things. In the episode "King of the Road", Half-Pint gets bullied by Hot Rodney about being slow, whilst in the episode "Midnight Monstering", he could not sleep last night due to his broken night light. He is voiced by Emma Tate.
 Hot Rodney – a brash, naughty, and reckless hot rod car. In the episode "Building Block Blunder", he shows a helpful side by shunting the building blocks to allow Buddy and Hot-Air to get free after the blocks had collapsed. He has teal livery with flames. He is voiced by Chris Jarvis.
 Hot Air – a strange 3-wheeled vehicle "bug", resembling a balloon on wheels. He travels around Dream Street by driving in reverse and communicates by making noises of a whoopee cushion. He is sometimes very naughty. In the episode "Check Up", he was tricked by Jack and Rodney that he has the case of the "Spotty Botty Bug". Also, in "Beep Beep!!" he takes Rodney's air horn and soon enough Buddy gets him one too. 
 Jack Hammer – a mischievous pneumatic drill. can be mischievous like Hot Air and Rodney. In "Building Block Blunder", he ties Hot Air to a lamp post to trick Buddy into thinking he had broken down, which ends up causing an accident that leaves both Buddy and Hot Air trapped in a mess of collapsed building blocks. He wears a blue cap on backwards. He is voiced by Dave Benson Phillips.
 The Wild Bunch – a group of traffic cones which like to cause nothing but trouble. They also love having F U N. ("and what does that spell? Fun." – The Narrator, King of the Road) 
 Ice Cool – a laid-back and relaxed ice cream van that has a large ice cream cone quiff, who likes to help out serve ice creams to his friends. He is voiced by Dave Benson Phillips.
 The Sleeping Policemen – pedestrian crossings literally consisting of slumbering police constables covered with striped blankets. Their respective names are PC Snooze, PC Snore, and PC Nod Off. They work with Daisy very well and are always very lazy. They sometimes don't pay attention to what they are doing. PC Snooze has pastel green skin with a deep Cockney accent, PC Snore has pastel peach skin with a Birmingham accent, and PC Nod Off has pastel lavender skin with a high Yorkshire accent. They are all voiced by Russ Abbot.
 The Gossips – a pair of traffic lights respectively named Scarlet & Amber who like to make the road safe and sometimes cause serious accidents. They are smart and responsible too. They are both voiced by Chris Jarvis.
 Tech – a grey mechanical robot whose magical powers enable Buddy to take on different roles. He is voiced by Russ Abbot.
 Other characters include two unnamed small three wheeled cars. One has a red and yellow livery and the other has a red and blue livery.

Episodes

Series 1-2 (1999)
This series was shot on 35mm film.

Series 3-5 (2000-2002)
This series was shot on tape.

References

External links
 Official website
 

1990s British animated television series
2000s British animated television series
1990s British children's television series
2000s British children's television series
1990s preschool education television series
2000s preschool education television series
1999 British television series debuts
2002 British television series endings
Animated preschool education television series
British children's animated adventure television series
British preschool education television series
English-language television shows
Fictional vehicles
ITV children's television shows
Television series by ITV Studios